In mathematics, the Langlands decomposition writes a parabolic subgroup P of a semisimple Lie group as a product  of a reductive subgroup M, an abelian subgroup A, and a nilpotent subgroup N.

Applications 

See also
Lie group decompositions

References

Sources
 A. W. Knapp, Structure theory of semisimple Lie groups. .

Lie groups
Algebraic groups